Mister México is the second edition of the contest Mister Mexico, with the exact date still to be announced. Thirty two candidates from the Republic of Mexico will compete to get the national title. The winner will get the title of Mister Mexico 2017 and will have the opportunity to represent Mexico in Mister World 2018.

Results

Contest areas

Top Model Challenge

Fitness Body Challenge

Sports Challenge

Multimedia Challenge

Cooking Challenge

Expo Ganadera Jalisco Challenge

5k Race

Talent

Stages

Candidates 
32 candidates run to win the title.

Male beauty pageants